The discography of American rapper Polo G consists of three studio albums and 39 singles (including 17 as a featured artist). His debut studio album, Die a Legend (2019), peaked at number 6 on the US Billboard 200. The album also includes singles such as "Finer Things", "Battle Cry", "Pop Out", and "Deep Wounds"; as well as a "Pop Out Again", a remix featuring Lil Baby and Gunna. "Pop Out" became Polo G's highest-charting song worldwide, peaking at number 11 on the US Billboard Hot 100. His second studio album, The Goat (2020), reached the number two spot on the US Billboard 200. The album was supported by five singles, including "Heartless", "Go Stupid", "DND", "Wishing for a Hero", and "Martin & Gina".

Polo G released "Rapstar" in April 2021 as the third single from his third studio album, Hall of Fame, with the song debuting at the number-one spot on the US Billboard Hot 100. Hall of Fame also became his first number-one album on the Billboard 200. At the end of 2021, he released a deluxe reissue of the album, Hall of Fame 2.0.

Studio albums

Deluxe albums

Singles

As lead artist

As featured artist

Other charted and certified songs

Guest appearances

Notes

References

External links
 
 
 
 

Discographies of American artists